The 2002 Bob Jane T-Marts 1000 was a motor race for V8 Supercars, held on 13 October 2002 at the Mount Panorama Circuit just outside Bathurst in New South Wales, Australia. It was the tenth round of the 2002 V8 Supercar Championship Series.

The race was the sixth running of the Australia 1000 race, first held after the organisational split over the Bathurst 1000 that occurred in 1997. It was the 45th race for which a lineage can be traced back to the 1960 Armstrong 500 held at Phillip Island (including the 1960 race itself).

The race was won by Mark Skaife and Jim Richards driving a Holden Racing Team prepared Holden VX Commodore. The pair were re-united in sharing a car at Bathurst for the first time in seven years having previously won the race together in 1991 and 1992. It was Skaife's fourth win and the seventh and final win for Richards, placing him second on the list of Bathurst 1000 winners. It was also the fourth win for the Holden Racing Team, successfully defending their 2001 victory.

This race is notable for featuring the longest stop-go penalties in the history of the V8 Supercars. A five-minute penalty was awarded to Greg Murphy due to a pit-lane infringement and a similar penalty was imposed on the Team Brock car (No. 05) for a similar offence.

Entry List

Qualifying

Qualifying

Top Fifteen Shootout
Runoff results as follows:

Starting grid
The following table represents the final starting grid for the race on Sunday:

Official results
Race results as follows:

* Owen Kelly practiced the #5 Falcon but was replaced by David Besnard due to illness after Besnard own car was withdrawn after it was crashed heavily by Wayne Gardner
** Ross Halliday practiced the #87 Falcon but was replaced by Peter Doulman after Doulman's own car (#24) failed to qualify.
*** Steven Johnson, Matthew Coleman and Peter Doulman (whose names are shown within brackets in the table above) did not drive during the race.

Statistics
 Provisional Pole Position – #21 John Bowe – 2:08.3873
 Pole Position – #1 Mark Skaife – 2:08.8278
 Fastest Lap – #21 Brad Jones – 2:09.5705
 Winners' Average Speed – 143.35 km/h

References

Further reading
 
Auto Action, 9–15 October 2002

External links
 Official race results
 Official V8 Supercar website
 CAMS Manual reference to Australian titles

Bob Jane T-Marts 1000
Motorsport in Bathurst, New South Wales